Severe Tropical Cyclone Rusty was a strong, slow-moving tropical cyclone that produced record duration gale-force winds in Port Hedland, Western Australia in late February 2013. Originating as an area of low pressure on 22 February well to the northwest of the Kimberley region of Western Australia, the precursor to Rusty steadily developed within a favourable environment. Gradually decreasing surface pressures in the region signaled intensification and the low was classified as Tropical Cyclone Rusty on 23 February. Although a large, sprawling system, near-record high sea surface temperatures enabled Rusty to quickly deepen. Becoming essentially stationary on 25 February, the system acquired hurricane-force winds as its core improved in structure. Thereafter, interaction with land caused its core to collapse before the system made landfall near Pardoo Station. Rusty weakened below cyclone strength on 28 February. Its remnants persisted over Western Australia for several more days before being absorbed into an extratropical cyclone on 5 March.

Some structural damage took place, but the predominant effects of the storm were sustained by agriculture and infrastructure. Economic losses related to the storm exceeds A$500 million (US$510 million). The name Rusty was later retired, replaced with Riordan in 2016.

Meteorological history

In late February 2013, a monsoon trough combined with the Madden–Julian oscillation to produce an area of low pressure on 22 February well to the northeast of the Kimberley region. Upon its formation, the Bureau of Meteorology (BoM) began monitoring the system as Tropical Low 10U. Low to moderate upper-level wind shear and favorable diffluence supported tropical cyclogenesis as the system moved slowly south along the edge of a subtropical ridge. By 23 February, deep convective banding features were wrapping into a well-defined circulation. This prompted the Joint Typhoon Warning Center (JTWC) to issue a Tropical Cyclone Formation Alert at 0300 UTC and subsequently initiate advisories on the storm as Tropical Cyclone 17S at 0000 UTC on 24 February. Surface pressures around the cyclone had significantly decreased by this time, with an automated weather station on Rowley Shoals, roughly 130 km (80 mi) southeast of the storm's centre, recording a 7 mbar (hPa; 0.21 inHg) drop to 993 hPa (mbar; 29.33 inHg) in 24 hours. The BoM similarly classified the system as a tropical cyclone hours later as gale-force winds were observed on Bedout Island.

A large monsoonal cyclone, Rusty featured an expansive cloud mass with a relatively cloud-free centre spanning 160 km (100 mi). Under normal circumstances, cyclones of this nature tend to develop slowly due to their sprawling nature; however, near-record high sea surface temperatures of  fueled an unusually quick organization. The high temperatures were linked to a record warm January across the entirety of Australia. Additionally the warmth extended to a great depth, resulting in a high tropical cyclone heat potential of 90 kJ/cm2. Throughout 24 February, convective bands steadily consolidated around the circulation as it intensified. The strongest winds continued to be displaced well to the south of the centre, however, within the most persistent convective band. This large, intense band extended westward from Broome to Port Hedland and into the western portion of Rusty's circulation. Increasingly rapid strengthening took place later in the day with a 35 km (25 mi) wide eye developing. Rusty became virtually stationary late on 25 February as a trough to its south weakened the ridge previously steering the cyclone south.

Throughout 25 February, the storm's eye expanded to an asymmetrical 95 by 185 km (60 by 115 mi) diameter. By 1200 UTC, Rusty had intensified into a severe tropical cyclone — a Category 3 or higher on the Australian cyclone intensity scale; this was supported by measurements of sustained  at Rowley Shoals. The large circulation began contracting later that day and into 26 February. Intensification resumed later that day and into 27 February. Favorable outflow, enhanced by a mid-latitude trough to the south, allowed for deep convection to form around the eyewall. The JTWC estimated one-minute sustained winds at this time to have been , equivalent to a Category 3 hurricane on the Saffir–Simpson hurricane wind scale. Shortly thereafter, the ridge over Australia began to rebuild and prompted Rusty to drift south-southeast. Interaction with the Australian mainland incited weakening of the cyclone. As it approached the Pilbara coastline, the eastern eyewall collapsed and its eye became increasingly cloud-filled.

Once onshore, steady weakening ensued. Within six hours, the eye dissipated and deep convection diminished, becoming more confined to the southern side of the circulation. The remnants continued southward over Western Australia, eventually opening up into a trough on 3 March. The system subsequently moved back over water that day before being absorbed by an approaching extratropical cyclone by 5 March.

Preparations

The Port of Port Hedland was shut down for 86 hours as the cyclone slowly moved by, causing significant disruptions to shipping. Twenty-six ships were evacuated from the port prior to the storm's arrival. Onshore mining was suspended for similar durations nearby. BHP Billiton, Rio Tinto Group, and Fortescue Metals Group temporarily shut down or scaled back all operations in the area. The prolonged closure of the port resulted in a 2.4% drop in iron ore prices. Losses from lack of productivity and revenue associated with the port closures exceeds A$500 million (US$510 million).

Coastal areas of Pilbara were placed on red alert on 26 February, meaning residents were on full lock down until the cyclone's passage. Approximately 500 people sought refuge in public shelters during the storm. As a preventative measure, a  stretch of the Great Northern Highway between Port Hedland and Sandfire was shut down for several days. The road closures caused food and gas shortages in some areas; however, police eventually let trucks with supplies through the closed roads. As the remnants of Rusty moved south, flood warnings were raised across the Goldfields-Esperance region by 2 March and flood-prone roads were shut down. A local race was cancelled due to the storm in Esperance.

Impact and aftermath

Owing to the slow movement of Rusty, many areas along coastal Pilbara experienced prolonged periods of gale-force winds and heavy rain. Sustained gales affected Port Hedland for a record-breaking 39 hours straight. Gusts reached  on Bedout Island before the anemometer failed. A large swath of Western Australia experienced heavy rains from the cyclone, with accumulations of at least  stretching from northwestern areas of Kimberley to central areas of the state. Another report from Pardoo stated that the area received  of rain in three days. Over five days,  fell at the Anna Plains Station, accounting for 65% of its seasonal rainfall. Many farmers in Western Australia considered the rain to be beneficial as it caused little damage outside Pardoo.

Discharge also reached a tremendous 7,843 m3/s (276,973 ft3/2). Between 26 February and 2 March, an estimated 1.4 million megalitres (370 billion gallons) of water flowed the river. The effects of flooding from the river were mainly confined to Pardoo Station, where significant cattle loss took place. The Nullagine, Oakover, and Coongan rivers rose above flood levels. Only minor damage took place in Port Hedland while some flooding took place in Kalgoorlie and Kambalda, with some homes damaged. Downed tree limbs and power lines in Port Hedland left 55 homes without power. Along the beach, a dolphin was washed ashore during the storm. It was brought to a tidal pool by Department of Environment and Conservation officers and cared for five hours before being released back into the ocean.

The storm also weakened the seasonal monsoon trough over southern areas of the country in early March, triggering an intense heat wave across the region. Melbourne, Victoria, saw a record nine days of high temperatures above  as the air mass moved east. Records in the city began in 1856. The city subsequently broke its record for continuous days with minimum temperatures of at least , reaching seven on 13 March. The Australian Energy Market Operator reported record electrical demands across the state of Victoria, with usage reaching more than 9,500 MW on 12 March. Owing to the prolonged heat, incidents requiring paramedics increased by 25 percent from the previous week.

Immediately following Rusty's landfall, the Department of Fire and Emergency Services placed 30 personnel on standby and began aerial surveys to determine if residents needed aid. Residents in Pilbara were warned of the dangers of asbestos in damaged or destroyed structures in early March as they were allowed to return home. A week after Rusty passed through Pilbara, an algal bloom the size of Tasmania appeared offshore. Unprecedented turbidity from the storm stirred up a large column of nutrients from the seafloor and brought it to the surface, causing the rapid increase in algae. Despite its size, it was not expected to have any lasting effects in the region.

Later in 2013, Rusty was retired from the list names in the Australian Basin. During November 2014 the name Rubina was chosen to replace Rusty. However, Rubina was later withdrawn and replaced by Riordan in an update to the names in October 2016

See also

2012–13 Australian region cyclone season
Cyclone Lua – A storm of similar intensity that struck the same regions a year prior
Cyclone Christine – A storm of similar intensity that struck the same regions at the very end of the year

References
Notes

General

External links

Rusty
Cyclone Rusty
Rusty 2013
Rusty 2013
Rusty 2013
Rusty
2010s in Western Australia